Michael Anthony D'Amato (born March 3, 1943) is a former American football defensive back.  A safety, he played college football at Hofstra University, and played professionally in the American Football League for the New York Jets in the 1968 season.  That season, the Jets defeated the Oakland Raiders in the AFL Championship game, and went on to humble the heavily favored NFL champion Baltimore Colts in the third AFL-NFL World Championship game.  He followed Jets center John Schmitt as the second Hofstra alumnus to play for the team.   D'Amato is now Hofstra's Special Assistant to the President for Alumni Affairs.

Hofstra University honored D'Amato in 2009 when it named the "Football and Lacrosse Traditions Project" in honor of Mike D'Amato '68 and Lou DiBlassi '61.  The project was a gift from Hofstra benefactor James Metzger '83 who insisted that the project be named as a tribute to D'Amato and DiBlassi. According to Metzger, a former lacrosse All-American himself, D'Amato is "the only person to have been both a lacrosse All-American and a member of a Super Bowl winning team" and "bleeds Hofstra blue and gold".  D'Amato was a football and lacrosse all-conference selection at Hofstra and is one of only four Hofstra alumni to ever earn a Super Bowl ring. In 2004 Hofstra honored D'Amato with the Joseph M. Margiotta Distinguished Service Award.

See also
Other American Football League players

References

External links
New York Jets bio

1943 births
Living people
Sportspeople from Brooklyn
Players of American football from New York City
American football safeties
Hofstra Pride football players
New York Jets players
American Football League players